Albicker is a surname. Notable people with the surname include:

Christian Albicker (1892–1934), Swiss footballer
Fritz Albicker (1893–1959), Swiss footballer